The 2015 Coke Zero 400 powered by Coca-Cola was a NASCAR Sprint Cup Series race that was held between July 5 and 6, 2015 at Daytona International Speedway in Daytona Beach, Florida. Contested over 161 laps – extended from the scheduled 160 laps – on the 2.5 mile (4 km) superspeedway, it was the 17th race of the 2015 NASCAR Sprint Cup Series season. Dale Earnhardt Jr. won the race, his second win of the season. His teammate Jimmie Johnson finished second while Denny Hamlin, Kevin Harvick, and Kurt Busch rounded out the top five.

With qualifying rained out, the field was set by first practice speeds and Earnhardt Jr. was given the first starting spot as a result. Further rain delays pushed the race's green flag back to 11:42 p.m., with the race concluding at 2:40 a.m. ET the following morning. Earnhardt Jr. led a race high of 96 laps on his way to winning the race. The race had 22 lead changes among twelve different drivers, as well as nine caution flag periods for 43 laps. The race was marred by a violent crash at the finish, most notably featuring Austin Dillon's car flipping into the outside catch fence.

It was Earnhardt Jr.'s 25th career victory, tenth career restrictor plate race win (in points competition), fourth at Daytona, and 14th at the track for Hendrick Motorsports. The win moved him up to second in the points standings. Chevrolet left Daytona with an 83-point lead over Ford in the manufacturer standings.

Report

Background

Daytona International Speedway is a race track in Daytona Beach, Florida, United States. Since opening in 1959, it has been the home of the Daytona 500, the most prestigious race in NASCAR. In addition to NASCAR, the track also hosts races of ARCA, AMA Superbike, USCC, SCCA, and Motocross. The track's  infield includes the  Lake Lloyd, which has hosted powerboat racing. The speedway is owned and operated by International Speedway Corporation.

The track was built in 1959 by NASCAR founder William "Bill" France, Sr. to host racing held at the former Daytona Beach Road Course. His banked design permitted higher speeds and gave fans a better view of the cars. Lights were installed around the track in 1998 and today, it is the third-largest single lit outdoor sports facility. The speedway has been renovated three times, with the infield renovated in 2004 and the track repaved twice — in 1978 and in 2010.

On January 22, 2013, the track unveiled artist depictions of a renovated speedway. On July 5 of that year, ground was broken for a project that would remove the backstretch seating and completely redevelop the frontstretch seating. The renovation to the speedway is being worked on by Rossetti Architects. The project, named "Daytona Rising", was completed in January 2016, and it costed US $400 million, placing emphasis on improving fan experience with five expanded and redesigned fan entrances (called "injectors") as well as wider and more comfortable seating with more restrooms and concession stands. After the renovations, the track's grandstands include 101,000 permanent seats with the ability to increase permanent seating to 125,000. The project was completed before the start of Speedweeks 2016.

Kevin Harvick entered Daytona with a 53-point lead over Martin Truex Jr. Joey Logano entered 57 back, Jimmie Johnson entered 70 back, and Dale Earnhardt Jr. entered 71 back.

Changes
During the Xfinity Series' Alert Today Florida 300 earlier in the year, a crash occurred in which Kyle Busch  slammed into a concrete wall just past the exit to pit road, breaking his leg and sidelining him for the first eleven races of the Sprint Cup season. In response to the accident, the entire outer wall of the race track was fitted with SAFER barriers. The grass near the entrance of turn 1 and towards the exit of the tri-oval, where Busch's accident occurred, were paved over.

At the request of the race's broadcaster, NBC, the 2015 Coke Zero 400 was moved from its traditional Saturday night scheduling to Sunday night. Track president Joie Chitwood III explained that NBC wanted to treat the race as a special event to launch its revived coverage, similarly to NBC's Sunday Night Football. The move also removed a potential conflict with NBC's annual Macy's Fourth of July Fireworks Spectacular special.

Entry list
The entry list for the Coke Zero 400 was released on Monday, June 29 at 11:41 a.m. EDT. Forty-five cars were entered for the race. All but the No. 21 Wood Brothers Racing Ford driven by Ryan Blaney were entered for the previous race at Sonoma Raceway. Driver changes for this race include Bobby Labonte in the No. 32 Go FAS Racing Ford normally driven by Mike Bliss, Brian Scott in the No. 33 Hillman-Circle Sport LLC Chevrolet normally driven by Alex Kennedy, and Brett Moffitt returning to the No. 34 Front Row Motorsports Ford.

Practice

First practice
Ten minutes into the session, Brad Keselowski made contact with Kyle Busch and sent him spinning in the middle of the pack. Michael Annett, Trevor Bayne, Greg Biffle, Carl Edwards, Denny Hamlin, Sam Hornish Jr., Jamie McMurray, Ryan Newman and Martin Truex Jr. were all collected in the wreck. “The 2 car got on my back rear and just spun us around,” Busch said. “There’s room to lift and sometimes you don’t.” “A couple of guys got in front of me right there,” Truex said. “They started checking up in front of me and the 18 went sideways, a lot of damage. We’re going to a backup car.”

Final practice

Qualifying

Two rounds of single-car qualifying were scheduled to take place on Saturday at 4:35 p.m. Eastern Daylight Time, but were cancelled due to rain. The lineup was set by first practice results. So Dale Earnhardt Jr. was declared as the polesitter per the NASCAR rulebook. “I asked Greg (Ives, crew chief) before we went out to practice what we were trying to accomplish in that first practice and that was the first thing he mentioned was to go out that first run and try to put a lap down because the weather wasn’t looking real good for today," Earnhardt said. "That was his decision. It ended up working out for us.” "This track has been very special to me, we know how important is to the sport," said Jeff Gordon, who'll start 23rd in his 46th and final career race at Daytona. "I'm kind of bummed out that it was rained out." Despite posting the 22nd fastest lap in first practice, Ryan Blaney failed to make the race. When qualifying is rained out, NASCAR's rules state that the number of attempts a race team has made determines the starting lineup before practice times. As a result, the No. 21 Wood Brothers Racing Ford failed to qualify for the first time in seven years. “I really hate this for Motorcraft/Quick Lane and all of our guests,” team co-owner Eddie Wood said in a release. “We’ve been lucky. This is the first time this has happened since we started part-time in 2009. We’ve dodged a lot of bullets, including last time in Michigan. This one got us, but if it has to happen, I’d rather it be for something we can’t control instead of for a lack of performance on our part.”

Starting lineup

Race
The race was scheduled to begin at 8:04 p.m. EDT on Sunday, but was delayed by rain that had been falling all afternoon. The green flag eventually fell at 11:42 p.m, marking the longest start delay of the race since the 2005 race. Race finished at 2:40 am EDT on Monday

First half

Start
Dale Earnhardt Jr. led the field to the green flag at 11:42 p.m. Austin Dillon drove to Earnhardt's outside on the backstretch to lead the first eight laps. The first caution of the race flew on lap 3 for a multi-car wreck exiting turn 4. It started when David Gilliland tried to drop in behind Earnhardt on the inside line, failing to see Clint Bowyer, and got turned around by Bowyer, and ten cars piled in. Michael Annett, Greg Biffle, Sam Hornish Jr., Bobby Labonte, reigning Daytona 500 winner Joey Logano, and Danica Patrick were also collected in the melee. A. J. Allmendinger,  Annett, Biffle, Jeb Burton, Brendan Gaughan, Gilliland, Hornish Jr., Logano, and Patrick were tagged for pitting before pit road was open and restarted the race from the tail-end of the field, although this was moot as they were going to restart at the rear of the field anyway as they had all taken on crash damage. Annett and Logano were held a lap on pit road for running the stop/go sign at pit exit.

The race restarted on lap 9. Earnhardt passed Dillon going into three to take the lead on lap 10. While trying to pass Jamie McMurray, Kyle Busch got loose and pounded the wall in turn 2 on lap 17. To make matters worse for Busch, the race remained green. The second caution of the race, a scheduled competition caution to allow teams to check tire wear, flew on lap 26. Jimmie Johnson exited pit road with the race lead. Biffle and Kyle Busch were tagged for having too many crew members over the wall to service the car and restarted the race from the tail-end of the field. Gaughan was busted for both speeding on pit road and running the stop/go sign on pit exit. He was held a lap on pit road and restarted the race from the tail-end of the field.

The race restarted on lap 31. Earnhardt took back the lead on lap 32. Johnson got a run on him going into turn 2 to retake the lead on lap 34. The third caution of the race flew on lap 53, when exiting turn 4, Carl Edwards snapped loose and turned down the apron. The culprit was a flat tire. “This is really frustrating,” said Edwards. “I never have flat tires. Goodyear does a pretty job. We got it back together, and then this happened.” Johnson swapped the lead with Earnhardt on pit road with the latter exiting with the lead. Biffle, Edwards, and Gaughan were tagged for pitting before pit road was open and restarted the race from the tail-end of the field. Casey Mears was tagged for driving through more than three pit boxes getting to his stall and restarted the race from the tail-end of the field.

Second quarter
The race restarted on lap 58. The fourth caution of the race flew on the same lap when, out of turn 4, Gilliland spun and then stalled on the track. Biffle, Burton, Kyle Busch, and Logano were tagged for pitting before pit road was open and restarted the race from the tail-end of the field. Annett was tagged for having too many crew members over the wall to service the car and restarted the race from the tail-end of the field.

The race restarted on lap 64. After riding single file for the first few laps, Kevin Harvick got a second line moving to the front of the pack. Johnson drove to Earnhardt's outside to take back the lead. Matt Kenseth used the outside line to briefly take the lead on lap 80. Johnson used the inside line to take back the lead on lap 81. The fifth caution of the race flew on lap 86 for a multi-car wreck in turn 2, when Kyle Larson spun, and Edwards spun trying to avoid him, then was hit from behind by Brian Scott, submarining under Edwards' car. Ricky Stenhouse Jr. also spun, but was able to save his car. Denny Hamlin exited pit road with the lead. Allmendinger, Edwards, and Larson were tagged for pitting before pit road was open and restarted the race from the tail-end of the field. Larson was also held a lap on pit road for running the stop/go sign at pit exit. Kyle Busch and Dillon were tagged for too many crew members over the wall to service the car and restarted the race from the tail-end of the field.

Second half

Halfway
The race restarted on lap 93. Kasey Kahne used a push from Harvick to take the lead. Hamlin used the outside line to take back the lead on lap 95. Earnhardt Jr. drove under Hamlin to retake the lead on lap 104. The sixth caution of the race flew on lap 105 for a multi-car wreck on the front stretch. This one started when, out of turn 4, Kenseth got turned by Kasey Kahne. Kenseth's car then washed up the track, collecting nine additional cars: those of Aric Almirola, Larson, Martin Truex Jr., Jamie McMurray, Brad Keselowski, Logano, Sam Hornish Jr., David Ragan and Trevor Bayne.  "I was following Jeff Gordon up through there and he got shuffled out and I kind of committed to him and we started moving back up there pretty good," Almirola said. "I was happy about the momentum we had and next thing I know some cars got together on the inside, and I heard the noise and heard them start to spin. ... It is a game of inches here sometimes, and I think a couple feet more forward and we wouldn't be in this. It stinks. I am certainly disappointed."

The race restarted with 46 laps to go. Johnson retook the lead. Earnhardt Jr. dove underneath his teammate to retake the lead with 43 laps to go. The seventh caution of the race flew with 33 laps to go when Patrick cut a right front tire in turn 2 and hit the outside wall. Michael Annett was tagged for speeding on pit road and restarted the race from the tail-end of the field.

The race restarted with 28 laps to go. The eighth caution of the race flew with twelve laps to go when Ragan got loose and turned down into the backstretch grass. Ragan did not suffer major damage, and stayed on the lead lap. He would manage to get back up to twelfth place at the checkered flag.

Final laps
The race restarted on lap 151. The ninth and final caution of the race flew three laps later when Hornish Jr. spun out on the backstretch in the same place that Ragan had spun in, and slid through the grass, getting airborne and almost flipping.

Green-white-checker

Attempt #1 and the "Big One"

The race restarted with two laps to go. Earnhardt Jr. held off the field to take the victory. "I had a lot of fun tonight," said Earnhardt, who led a race-high 96 laps. "Our car was fast. I had to block a lot and you’ve got to run real, real hard to win here." As the field raced to the checkered flag, Harvick tapped Hamlin from behind, instigating a massive wreck involving at least 24 cars. In the resulting chaos, Dillon's car struck Hamlin at such an angle that it flipped over and flew two lanes in the air into the catch fence, ripping out the engine. Dillon's car landed back on the track upside down, coming to a rest at the exit to the pit road, and was then hit again by Keselowski, who spun in oil while trying to avoid the crash. The impact was similar to Bobby Allison's 1987 Winston 500, Geoff Bodine's 2000 Daytona 250, Carl Edwards 2009 Aaron's 499, and Kyle Larson's 2013 DRIVE4COPD 300 wrecks. Five fans were injured by debris, with one taken to Halifax Medical Center and later released, while the other four were treated and released from the infield care center. Upon coming to a stop, Dillon was helped out of his car by Earnhardt's and Mears's pit crews to loud cheers, and walked away. He was treated and released from the infield care center with a bruised tailbone and forearm.

Post-race

Driver comments
"It was very vicious," Dillon said of the crash. "It's twisting you around in there, and the belts are loosening with each hit, so the hits are getting more and more violent. By the fourth hit, you've separated enough so that the fourth one is going to hurt more than others. I held on to the steering wheel as hard as I could. I'm sure I'm going to find more bumps and bruises during the week, but right now I feel all right. It was just crazy. It's part of this racing. Everybody is pushing as hard as they can — pushing in a tight pack. I was pushing the 24 (Jeff Gordon) and the people behind are pushing me, It was just a wad right there at the end. At these speedway races, you're just praying and hoping that you get through it. I thought the wreck was over and I was sliding on the roof. I thought, 'We made it. We made it.' And then there was a big bang. I think it was the 2 car (Keselowski) that ran into me. Literally I had just got done stopping and crew members were everywhere. I thought that was really cool and special. It was comforting to me. They got to me pretty quick. I just wanted to get out of there and let the fans know I was OK."

Dillon also spoke about the safety of the fans. "It's not really acceptable, I don't think," Dillon told reporters after exiting the care center. "We've got to figure out something. Our speeds are too high, I think. I think everybody could get good racing with slower speeds. We can work at that, and then figure out a way to keep the cars on the ground. That's the next thing. We're fighting hard to make the racing good. I hope the fans appreciate that. We don't, but it's our job. You go out there and hold it wide open to the end and hope you make it through."

Other drivers commented on Dillon's wreck after the race. "You are just on the verge of tears," Earnhardt said in victory lane. "I saw everything in the mirror pretty clearly ... I just was very scared for whoever that car was. I didn't care about anything except figuring out who was OK. The racing doesn't matter anymore." Audio of Earnhardt's radio chatter with his crew chief was later released revealing Earnhardt's horrified reaction to the crash in the moment, with him too concerned over Dillon's status to celebrate his win. "I'm shocked that Austin Dillon is even alive," said Jimmie Johnson after finishing runner-up. "I expected the worst when I came back around."

Race results

Race statistics
22 lead changes among 12 different drivers
9 cautions for 43 laps
Time of race: 2 hours, 58 minutes, 58 seconds
Average speed: 
Dale Earnhardt Jr. took home $300,040 in winnings

Race awards
 Coors Light Pole Award: None
 3M Lap Leader: Dale Earnhardt Jr. (96 laps)
 American Ethanol Green Flag Restart Award: Carl Edwards
 Duralast Brakes "Bake In The Race" Award: Austin Dillon
 Freescale "Wide Open": Jimmie Johnson
 Ingersoll Rand Power Move: Kurt Busch (10 positions)
 MAHLE Clevite Engine Builder of the Race: Hendrick Engines, #88
 Mobil 1 Driver of the Race: Dale Earnhardt Jr. (131.9 driver rating)
 Moog Steering and Suspension Problem Solver of The Race: Austin Dillon (crew chief Richard Labbe (0.022 seconds))
 NASCAR Sprint Cup Leader Bonus: No winner: rolls over to $140,000 at next event
 Sherwin-Williams Fastest Lap: Casey Mears (Lap 78, 44.490)
 Sunoco Rookie of The Race: Matt DiBenedetto

Media

Television
The 2015 Coke Zero 400 marked the return of NBC Sports to NASCAR, as part of a new ten-year deal replacing TNT and ESPN as broadcaster of the second half of the season; it was the first race broadcast by NBC since the 2006 Ford 400. Rick Allen, 2000 race winner Jeff Burton and Steve Letarte had the call in the booth for the race. Dave Burns, Mike Massaro, Marty Snider and Kelli Stavast handled pit road for the television side.

Radio
MRN had the radio call for the race, which was simulcast on Sirius XM NASCAR Radio. Joe Moore, Jeff Striegle and Rusty Wallace called the race from the booth when the field was racing through the tri-oval. Dave Moody called the race from the Sunoco tower outside turn 2 when the field was racing through turns 1 & 2. Mike Bagley called the race from a platform on the inside of the track towards turn 3 when the field was racing down the backstretch. Kurt Becker called the race from the Sunoco tower outside turn 4 when the field was racing through turns 3 & 4. Alex Hayden, Winston Kelley and Steve Post worked pit road for the radio side.

Standings after the race

Drivers' Championship standings

Manufacturers' Championship standings

Note: Only the first sixteen positions are included for the driver standings.

Note

References

Coke Zero 400
Coke Zero 400
NASCAR races at Daytona International Speedway